BZ20 is the fifth studio album by Irish boy band Boyzone, released on 22 November 2013 by Rhino Records. It was mainly produced by Brian Rawling, Paul Meehan, and Matt Furmidge. As of October 2014, the album had sold 250,000 copies worldwide.

Background
Boyzone's fifth album was originally going to be released in late 2010, but it was shelved due to Ronan Keating's commitments on The X Factor Australia. Due to the success of their previous album Brother (2010), Boyzone decided to celebrate 20 years since they began with a new studio album and tour. It was announced on 24 September 2013 that the brand new album would be released on 25 November 2013, and it became available to pre-order from Amazon. In September 2013, it was announced that Boyzone were recording their new studio album BZ20 at Metrophonic with Brian Rawling producing it. The band signed a new four-album recording deal with Warner Music to release BZ20 on 22 November 2013 through the Rhino label.

In a statement, Boyzone said: "We're incredibly proud to announce the release of our new studio album BZ20 and our new home at Warner Music. It seems crazy that 20 years have passed since we first got together but we are as excited now with the new album as we were back then. Bring on the next 20 years!"

It was also revealed that Boyzone will be making a programme discussing the album called Boyzone at 20, featuring clips of the band since their beginning in 1993 on ITV due for broadcast end of November 2013.

The artwork of the album was revealed on Twitter and Facebook and fans were encouraged to tweet a link and gradually the image started to be seen.

Singles
"Love Will Save the Day" was released as the album's lead single on 8 November 2013. On 22 October 2013 the video for the song was released. The song was written by Jez Ashurst and Viktoria Hansen, and it was produced by Paul Meehan, Matt Furmidge, and Brian Rawling. It was first performed on the Australian The X Factor and given its first airplay in the United Kingdom on BBC Radio 2 in October 2013. "Love Will Save the Day" debuted at number 42 in Ireland, becoming the band's lowest-charting single to date. In the United Kingdom, the song debuted at number 39, becoming their second-lowest charting single.

"Light Up the Night" was released as the album's second and final single in February 2014.

Promotion
The album is supported by the BZ20 Tour. On 9 November 2013, Boyzone performed the song on The Jonathan Ross Show. On 22 November they performed on The Paul O'Grady Show. Further TV appearances include Loose Women and Lorraine. Boyzone sang live on The Terry Wogan Show on BBC Radio 2 on 17 November two songs from the album - "Love Will Save the Day" and "Everything I Own". On 20 November 2013, Boyzone exclusively streamed their brand new album on Digital Spy. Boyzone performed the song 'Everything I Own' on BBC1 during Sport Relief and ITV Surprise Surprise during March 2014. The album has sold 250,000 copies worldwide including 200,000 copies in the UK and 10,000 copies in Germany.

Reception

Critical reception

David Callaghan of RenownedForSound said that "Boyzone are one form of music group that never seems to age and that they have a legacy not many other artists or groups combined could try and reach. Going on, he said that Ronan Keating, arguably their most notable member, starts us off with the cheesy yet powerful ballad Love Will Save the Day, and you can picture every girl, woman and grandmother have a tear in their eye and a melted heart in their hands. Everything I Own, Centre of Gravity and Heaven Is, continues the notion of soppy sweetness and screaming women from afar. Of course I can’t take anything away from Boyzone, this is what they’ve built their success on and for the most part it’s worked, so I congratulate each and every one of them. To take a look at the titles of all eleven tracks on the album, you know before you listen exactly what you’re going to get, if you didn’t know by now. BZ20 is a solid album, Boyzone do sound as good as ever. They don’t appear to of sold out and cashed in on a novelty album, like many other boy bands have done time and again. They stay consistent, sound very strong and coherent musically, and have produced and album that will keep everyone happy."

Commercial performance
In the United Kingdom, the album debuted at number six on the UK Albums Chart with first-week sales of 30,466 copies. As of December 2014, it has sold 199,854 copies in the UK.

Track listing
Boyzone announced the track listing on Twitter on 24 October 2013.

Credits and personnel
Credits adapted from AllMusic.

Jez Ashurst – composer
Steve Baccon – photography
Dick Beetham – mastering
Tony Buchen – vocal engineer
Don DuBose – composer
Ben Earle – composer
Anthony Egizii – composer
Kristoffer Fogelmark – composer
Matt Furmidge – mixer, producer
David Ashworth Gates – composer
Viktoria Hansen – composer
Ed Hill – composer
Simon Johnson – guitar
Josh Kear – composer
Dom Liu – engineer
Lee McCutcheon – composer, keyboards, producer

Dan McDougall – composer
Paul Meehan – keyboards, producer
Don Mescall – composer
Ryan Miller – vocal engineer
Andreas Moe – composer
David Musumeci – composer
Albin Nedler – composer
Danny Orton – composer
Adam Phillips – guitar
Brian Rawling – producer
Mark Read – composer
Joe Rich – composer
Pat Roche – guitar
Ric Salmon – A&R
Dave Turner – mastering
Rob Wells – composer
Justine Young – A&R

Charts

Weekly charts

Year-end charts

Certifications and sales

References

2013 albums
Boyzone albums
Albums produced by Brian Rawling